Speed is the rate of motion, change, or activity.

Speed may also refer to:

People and fictional characters
 Speed (name), a list of people and fictional characters with the surname, given name or nickname

Places

United States
 Speed, Indiana
 Speed, Kansas
 Speed, Missouri
 Speed, North Carolina
 Speed, West Virginia

Elsewhere
 Speed, Victoria, Australia
 Speed River, Canada

Arts and entertainment

Amusement rides
 Speed (ride), a pendulum fair ride
 Speed: No Limits, a roller coaster at Oakwood Theme Park in Wales
 Speed – The Ride, a roller coaster formerly at the Sahara Hotel and Casino in Las Vegas

Film and television
 Speed (serial), a 1922 film serial directed by George B. Seitz
 Speed (1925 film), an American film starring Betty Blythe
 Speed (1936 film), an American film starring James Stewart
 Speed (1983 film), a Soviet film directed by Dmitry Svetozarov
 Speed (1984 film), an IMAX documentary
 Speed (1994 film), an American film starring Keanu Reeves and Sandra Bullock
 Speed (2007 film), an Indian film starring Zayed Khan and Urmila Matondkar
 Speed (2015 film), a South Korean film written and directed by Lee Sang-woo
 Speed (Australian TV network), a defunct motorsport network
 Speed (TV network), a defunct American motorsports and automobiles channel
 Speed (TV series), a 2001 British series about fast vehicles

Music
 Speed metal or "speed", a subgenre of heavy metal music
 Speedcore or "speed", a subgenre of hardcore techno
 Speed (Australian band), an Australian heavy metal band, formed in 2019
 Speed (Japanese band), a female vocal/dance group
 Speed (South Korean band), a group created from members of Coed School
 "Speed" (Billy Idol song), 1994
 "Speed" (Buck-Tick song), 1991
 "Speed" (Montgomery Gentry song), 2002
 "Speed" (Zazie song), 2018
 "Speed", a song by Bond from Shine, 2002

Other
 IShowSpeed or Speed, American YouTuber, streamer, and rapper Darren Watkins Jr. (born 2005)
 Speed Art Museum, Louisville, Kentucky
 Speed (card game), a shedding game
 Speed (Marvel Comics), a fictional superhero
 Speed (novel), a 1970 novel by William S. Burroughs Jr.

Other uses 
 Amphetamine, substituted amphetamine, and related compounds, in slang
 Speed (finance), in quantitative finance, a third-order Greek
 J. B. Speed School of Engineering, formerly Speed Scientific School, at the University of Louisville
 Lens speed, the maximum aperture or light-gathering ability of an optical system
 Transmission (mechanics), a gear or sprocket configuration
 Independence Speed Tandem, a German paraglider design